Cothurus iridescens is a species of beetle in the genus Cothurus. It was described in 1891.

References

Mordellidae
Beetles described in 1891